Dactyloscopus pectoralis, the whitesaddle stargazer, is a species of sand stargazer native to the Pacific coast of Baja California, Mexico and the Gulf of Mexico.  It can reach a maximum length of  TL.

References

External links
 Photograph

pectoralis
Taxa named by Theodore Gill
Fish described in 1861